The 1991 Coalite World Matchplay was a professional non-ranking snooker tournament that took place in December 1991 in Doncaster, England.
  
Gary Wilkinson won the event, defeating Steve Davis 18–11 in the final.

Main draw

References

World Matchplay
World Matchplay (snooker)
World Matchplay
1991